Likoshan is a village in the Glogovac municipality of Kosovo, in the region of Drenica. It was the site of a battle between the KLA and Serbian forces, and a massacre, in February 1998 during the Kosovo War. It is inhabited by Albanians.

Notes

References

Villages in Drenas